Alice in Wonderland is a 1999 made-for-television film adaptation of Lewis Carroll's books Alice's Adventures in Wonderland (1865) and Through the Looking-Glass (1871). It is currently the last production to adapt the original stories (as Tim Burton's 2010 film was written as a sequel) and was first broadcast on NBC and then shown on British television on Channel 4.

Tina Majorino played the lead role of Alice and a number of well-known performers portrayed the eccentric characters whom Alice meets during the course of the story, including Ben Kingsley, Martin Short, Whoopi Goldberg, Peter Ustinov, Christopher Lloyd, Gene Wilder, George Wendt, Robbie Coltrane and Miranda Richardson. In common with most adaptations of the book, it includes scenes and characters from Through the Looking-Glass.

The film won four Emmy Awards in the categories of costume design, makeup, music composition and visual effects.

The film was re-released as a special edition DVD on March 2, 2010, no special features were included, however the film was restored to its original speed as prior releases suffered from PAL speed up. A rare behind-the-scenes documentary of the film was released to YouTube in 2019, the 20th anniversary of the films release.

Plot
Alice is unwillingly preparing a presentation of the song "Cherry Ripe" for a garden party. Nagged by her governess (Dilys Laye) and facing stage fright, strangers and a song she dislikes, Alice runs out of the house and hides in the woods. An apple falls down from the tree and hovers in Alice's face. She then encounters the White Rabbit (voiced by Richard Coombs) and follows him down the rabbit hole, landing in Wonderland.

In an attempt to enter a small door and hide in a beautiful garden, Alice shrinks and grows into a giant, floods a room with tears and shrinks to mouse size. She meets Mr. Mouse (Ken Dodd) and his avian friends who attend a boring history lecture and participate in a Caucus Race. Alice again encounters the White Rabbit, who directs her to his house. Alice comes across a bottle of liquid which makes her grow and traps her in the house. The White Rabbit and his gardeners Pat (Jason Byrne) and Bill (Paddy Joyce) attempt to remove Alice but she shrinks again.

Wandering in long grass, she meets Major Caterpillar (Ben Kingsley), who tells her not to be afraid when performing. After he transforms into a butterflies, Alice returns to normal size by eating part of his mushroom. In a nearby manor house she meets the musical Duchess (Elizabeth Spriggs), her baby, her pepper-obsessed, plate-throwing cook (Sheila Hancock) and the Cheshire Cat (Whoopi Goldberg). The baby is left in Alice's care but turns into a pig and is released. The Cheshire Cat advises Alice to visit the Mad Hatter and his friends the March Hare and Dormouse.

Meeting the trio at a tea party, Alice is given advice on the fun of performing and how to get around stage fright. The Mad Hatter (Martin Short) leaps onto the table to perform as he previously had at a concert of the wicked Queen of Hearts. Alice leaves when the Mad Hatter and March Hare start to cause havoc and bully the Dormouse.

Alice once again finds the small door and manages to enter the garden, which is actually a labyrinth maze belonging to the Queen of Hearts (Miranda Richardson). The Queen invites her to a bizarre game of croquet, but her love for beheading people annoys Alice. The Cheshire Cat's head appears in the sky and is ordered to be executed, but Alice's logic stays the order. Alice escapes the croquet game and meets the Gryphon (voiced by Donald Sinden) and Mock Turtle (Gene Wilder). The two sing with Alice, encouraging her and teaching her the Lobster Quadrille dance. Alice then wanders away and meets the White Knight (Christopher Lloyd), who encourages her to be brave when she goes home.

Alice meets some talking flowers: a Tiger-Lily (voiced by Joanna Lumley), the most sensible of all, some roses, who are rude and not too bothered about Alice being lost, and some daisies, who are rascals. Having the flowers help her, Alice walks off then meets Tweedledum and Tweedledee (Robbie Coltrane and George Wendt), who have some antics with her before getting into a fight. Alice is then taken by a pair of card soldiers to the royal court, where the Knave of Hearts (Jason Flemyng) is put on trial for apparently stealing the Queen's jam tarts. Alice is then called to the stand, but she uses some mushroom to grow to great heights. She sees the jam tarts have been untouched and the trial is pointless. She openly criticises the Queen, King Cedric and the people of Wonderland. The White Rabbit, who is present at the court, reveals he lured Alice into Wonderland to conquer her fears and asks her if she has self-confidence. Upon Alice answering yes, he states, "then you don't need us anymore." He then sends her back home using the same hovering apple that brought her there in the first place.

Awakening back home seconds after the apple fell, Alice courageously sings in front of her parents and their guests (who all resemble the Wonderland characters), but instead of singing "Cherry Ripe", she sings the Lobster Quadrille. The audience, to Alice's delight, enjoy her performance. Alice spots her cat Dinah in the audience, who is really the Cheshire Cat who grins at her in congratulations.

Cast
 Tina Majorino as Alice – A curious young girl who is nervous and unenthusiastic about performing the song Cherry Ripe at her parents' party in the beginning. After her adventures in Wonderland, she finds the confidence to sing.
 Miranda Richardson as Queen of Hearts – A childish queen whose only way of dealing with anger is to shout "Off with their heads!" She occasionally screams in a very high pitch as a persuasive tactic. At the Knave's trial, she hosts a croquet game involving hedgehog balls and flamingo mallets. The trial turned out to be held under unfounded pretenses.
 Martin Short as the Mad Hatter – A mad haberdasher whose tea party Alice happens upon. Other party guests are the March Hare and the Dormouse. The Hatter and the March Hare are quite rude to Alice, insulting her several times and shooing her away. Nevertheless, the Mad Hatter performs a bizarre rendition of "Twinkle Twinkle Little Star" for Alice. He informs Alice that he once sang the same piece during the Queen's concert but was sent away because she was offended by his performance. The Mad Hatter was also called as a witness to the Knave's trial, where he reprised his performance, further angering the queen and causing her to chase him away as she shouted "off with his head!" Presumably, he and the March Hare escaped decapitation again due to their speed. 
 Whoopi Goldberg as the Cheshire Cat – A grinning cat who teaches Alice "the rules" of Wonderland. She was also one of the few characters who was nice to Alice. Her favorite pastime is appearing and disappearing.
 Simon Russell Beale as The King of Hearts – The foolish husband of the Queen who constantly tries to be like his wife and fawns over her.
 Ken Dodd as Mr. Mouse – A very kind, funny and wise mouse who tries to get Alice dry with a very boring lecture. When it fails, the Dodo suggests that they have a caucus race. Mr. Mouse is last seen going home, along with his friends, for a cup of hot chocolate.
 Gene Wilder as The Mock Turtle – A weird type of turtle who often cries on remembering his moments at his school in the sea. He sings two songs to Alice: The Lobster Quadrille and Beautiful Soup. His best friend is the Gryphon.
 Francis Wright as the voice of the March Hare – The Mad Hatter's mad tea party companion. His costume scared Tina Majorino because of the asymmetrical eyes. His puppetry was performed by Adrian Getley, Robert Tygner and Francis Wright.
 George Wendt and Robbie Coltrane as Tweedledee and Tweedledum, respectively – Two fat brothers who tell Alice the story of The Walrus and the Carpenter. After this, Ned Tweedledum finds his new rattle spoiled, which he thinks was spoiled by Fred Tweedledee. They have a brief battle which is interrupted by a monstrous crow which scares them away.
 Richard Coombs as the voice of the White Rabbit – A human-sized rabbit who is always running late. He serves as herald to the Queen and King. Alice also got stuck in his house in the film. He was performed by Kiran Shah and Richard Coombs.
 Christopher Lloyd as The White Knight – A kind knight who invented a lunchbox which he carries upside down so the sandwiches in it do not get wet. Alice points out that since it is upside down, and the lid is not closed, the sandwiches will fall out. He replies with, "So that's what happened to my sandwiches." He is also not very good at riding his horse.
 Elizabeth Spriggs as The Duchess – A duchess who is first seen nursing a baby which turns into a pig. Her pet is the Cheshire Cat. She was occasionally kind to Alice.
 Ken Sansom as The Baby - A baby wailing turning into a pig.
 Ben Kingsley as Major Caterpillar – A caterpillar major who is first seen smoking a hookah. He gives Alice advice on how to be brave on singing.
 Peter Ustinov and Pete Postlethwaite as The Walrus and the Carpenter, respectively – Two characters in the Tweedles' story.
 Donald Sinden as the voice of the Gryphon – A creature (with a look of both lion and eagle) who is the Mock Turtle's best friend. He shows Alice to him and used to go to school in the sea with the Mock Turtle. The Gryphon was operated by puppeteers David Alan Barclay, Adrian Getley, Adrian Parish, Mark Hunter and Robert Tygner.
 Jason Flemyng as The Knave of Hearts – A clueless knave who is accused of stealing the Queen's tarts. The Queen constantly refers to him as an idiot.
 Jason Byrne and Paddy Joyce as Pat and Bill the Lizard, respectively – The White Rabbit's two loyal Irish gardeners. Pat is very reluctant to do his job while Bill is a little more trustworthy.
 Liz Smith, Ken Campbell, Heathcote Williams and Peter Bayliss as Miss Lory, Mr. Duck, Mr. Eaglet and Mr. Dodo, respectively. – The Mouse's group of friends who are in the caucus race.
 Joanna Lumley as Tiger Lily – A very talkative flower who gives Alice directions.
 Sheila Hancock as The Cook – The Duchess's crazy cook who enjoys putting pepper in her meals. She also likes throwing dishes at Alice and the Duchess.
 Murray Melvin as Executioner – The Queen's chief executioner who argues that it would be impossible to behead the Cheshire Cat because the animal doesn't have a body.
 Nigel Plaskitt as the voice of the Dormouse – The Mad Hatter and March Hare's tea party companion who is asleep through most of the tea party scene. He seems to have a fondness for treacle and was later stuffed into a teapot by his companions. His puppeteers were Nigel Plaskitt and David Alan Barclay.
 Nigel Plaskitt as the voice of the Pig Baby – A rather ugly baby who is first seen being nursed by the Duchess. He soon turns into a pig. Puppeteered by Adrian Parish.
 Peter Eyre and Hugh Lloyd as the Frog and Fish Footmen – Two footmen who were first seen standing in front of the Duchess's house. The Fishface handed the Frogface an invitation for the Duchess to play croquet, then walked away. The Frogface was also rather stupid.
 Matthew Sim, Jonathan Broadbent and Christopher Ryan as the Rose Painting Cards – The three cards were first seen painting white roses red because they accidentally planted them white and if the Queen found out she would behead them. The Queen soon found out and Alice saved them by hiding them in her pocket.
 Gerard Naprous as the Red Knight – A knight who challenges the White Knight to a fight. In the end, they decided not to fight anymore. The Red Knight then leaves on his horse.
 Janine Eser as Alice's mother.
 Jeremy Brudenell as Alice's father.
 Mary Healey as Nanny
 Dilys Laye as Governess
 John Owens as Red Bishop
 Christopher Greet as White Castle

Special effects
The film utilized both puppetry and live-action footage. The puppet designs were created by Jim Henson's Creature Shop.

In all, 875 special digital effects were created for the film. An example is Martin Short's head; it was enlarged to three times its size to resemble the Hatter in Tenniel's illustrations.

In December 2018, composer Richard Hartley was interviewed for Tammy Tuckey's "Rattling the Stars" podcast about his work on the film for the 20th anniversary, providing never-before-heard stories.

In 2019, a behind the scenes documentary of the film was released on YouTube, which had originally been broadcast on the Hallmark Channel in 1999 and had not been included on any VHS, DVD, or digital releases of the film.

Reception
The original NBC airing averaged a 14.8 household rating and a 22 percent audience share and was watched by 25.34 million viewers, ranking as the 6th highest rated program that week in terms of households and the most watched program that week in terms of total viewers.

Critical response

On review aggregator website Rotten Tomatoes, the film has an approval rating of 33% based on 6 critical reviews.

David Zurawik gave the film a positive review in The Baltimore Sun, calling it a " grand and magical production" and praising the cast's performances, particularly  Majorino and Wilder. Rating the film 2 out of 5 stars, David Parkinson of Radio Times praised the "wondrous Jim Henson puppetry" and the performances of Richardson and Wilder; however, he found the film "still falls short of the cherished images taken from those first readings of Lewis Carroll's classic tales."

Awards

References

External links

 
 

1999 television films
1999 films
1999 fantasy films
German children's films
German fantasy films
German television films
RTL (German TV channel) original programming
British children's films
British fantasy films
British television films
Films directed by Nick Willing
Films based on Alice in Wonderland
Sonar Entertainment films
Films based on multiple works of a series
NBC network original films
American children's films
American fantasy films
American television films
1990s American films
1990s British films
1990s German films